Jack Elliott may refer to:

 Jack Elliott (rugby union) (1871–1938), Welsh rugby union player
 John Elliot (songwriter) (1914–1972), American songwriter, also known as Jack Elliott
 Jack Elliott (racing journalist) (1922–2007), Australian horse racing journalist
 Jack Elliott (composer) (1927–2001), American television and film composer
 Ramblin' Jack Elliott (born 1931), American folk performer
 Jack D. Elliot (born 1971), American record producer and songwriter
 Jack Elliott (footballer) (born 1995), English footballer
 Jack Elliott (broadcaster), American radio personality
 Jack Elliott (album), a 1964 album by Ramblin' Jack Elliott

See also
John Elliot (disambiguation)
John Elliott (disambiguation)

Elliott, Jack